The Good, the Bad, and the Indifferent is a collection of short stories by American author Joe R. Lansdale, dating from his early career, published in 1997 as a limited edition by Subterranean Press. Many of the stories were never published before and none of which have ever been collected before. This book has sold out both the numbered and lettered editions.

The title is a play on Sergio Leone's western film The Good, the Bad and the Ugly.  It is the part of a trilogy-of-sorts of Lansdale anthologies, preceded by A Fist Full of Stories (and Articles) and followed by For a Few Stories More.

The original, full extended title was The Good, The Bad, and the Indifferent: Early Stories and Commentaries by Joe R. Lansdale.

It contains:
"All the Little Animals"
"The Amusement Park"
"At the Mouth of Time"
"Cowboy"
"A Debt to Pay"
"Devil in the Hole"
Escape Artist"
"For Whom the Bell Blows"
"A Frog-Strangler"
"From Little Things"
"Full Report at Ten"
"Futility"
"Hang in There"
"Hickory, Dickory, Dock"
"The Honeymoon"
"Huitzilopochtli"
"The Hungry Locust"
"The Junkyard"  (originally published in Dark Regions #3, 1989)
"Knock Knock"
"The Last of the Hopeful"
"The Man Who Could Not Get Four in a Row"
"The Man Who Dreamed"
"Night Drive"
"One Death, Two Episodes"
"The Pit of Kundolkan"
"The Princess"  (originally published in Mummy!, ed. Bill Pronzini, 1980)
"Quack"
"Saved"
"Trapped in the Saturday Matinee"
"The Valley of the Swastika"
"Walks"  (originally published in Cemetery Dance Fall 1997)
"Waziah"  (originally published in Creature!, ed. Bill Pronzini, (1981)
"Why Does It Cry?"
"The Yard Man"

References

External links
Author's Official Website
Publisher's Website

Short story collections by Joe R. Lansdale
1997 short story collections
Horror short story collections
Subterranean Press books